In operations research, cuckoo search is an optimization algorithm developed by Xin-She Yang and Suash Deb
in 2009. It was inspired by the obligate brood parasitism of some cuckoo species by laying their eggs in the nests of host birds of other species. Some host birds can engage direct conflict with the intruding cuckoos. For example, if a host bird discovers the eggs are not their own, it will either throw these alien eggs away or simply abandon its nest and build a new nest elsewhere. Some cuckoo species such as the New World brood-parasitic Tapera have evolved in such a way that female parasitic cuckoos are often very specialized in the mimicry in colors and pattern of the eggs of a few chosen host species. Cuckoo search idealized such breeding behavior, and thus can be applied for various optimization problems. It has been shown that cuckoo search is a special case of the well-known (μ + λ)-evolution strategy.

Metaphor 
Cuckoo search (CS) uses the following representations:

Each egg in a nest represents a solution, and a cuckoo egg represents a new solution. The aim is to use the new and potentially better solutions (cuckoos) to replace a not-so-good solution in the nests. In the simplest form, each nest has one egg. The algorithm can be extended to more complicated cases in which each nest has multiple eggs representing a set of solutions.

CS is based on three idealized rules: 
 Each cuckoo lays one egg at a time, and dumps its egg in a randomly chosen nest;
 The best nests with high quality of eggs will carry over to the next generation;
 The number of available hosts nests is fixed, and the egg laid by a cuckoo is discovered by the host bird with a probability . In this case, the host bird can throw the egg away/abandon the nest, and build a completely new nest.

In addition, Yang and Deb discovered that the random-walk style search is better performed by Lévy flights rather than simple random walk.

Algorithm 
The pseudo-code can be summarized as:

 Objective function: 
 Generate an initial population of  host nests; 
 While (t<MaxGeneration) or (stop criterion)
     Get a cuckoo randomly (say, i) and replace its solution by performing Lévy flights;
     Evaluate its quality/fitness 
         [For maximization,  ];
     Choose a nest among n (say, j) randomly;
     if,
         Replace j by the new solution;
     end if
     A fraction of the worse nests are abandoned and new ones are built;
     Keep the best solutions/nests;
     Rank the solutions/nests and find the current best;
     Pass the current best solutions to the next generation;
 end while

An important advantage of this algorithm is its simplicity. In fact, comparing with other population- or agent-based metaheuristic algorithms such as particle swarm optimization and harmony search, there is essentially only a single parameter  in CS (apart from the population size ). Therefore, it is very easy to implement.

Random walks and the step size 

An important issue is the applications of Lévy flights and random walks in the generic equation for generating new solutions

 
where  is drawn from a standard normal distribution with zero mean and unity standard deviation for random walks, or drawn from Lévy distribution for Lévy flights. Obviously, the random walks can also be linked with the similarity between a cuckoo's egg and the host's egg which can be tricky in implementation. Here the step size  determines how far a random walker can go for a fixed number of iterations. The generation of Lévy step size is often tricky, and a comparison of three algorithms (including Mantegna's) was performed by Leccardi who found an implementation of Chambers et al.'s approach to be the most computationally efficient due to the low number of random numbers required.

If s is too large, then the new solution generated will be too far away from the old solution (or even jump outside of the bounds). Then, such a move is unlikely to be accepted. If s is too small, the change is too small to be significant, and consequently such search is not efficient. So a proper step size is important to maintain the search as efficient as possible.

As an example, for simple isotropic random walks, we know that the average distance  traveled in the d-dimension space is
 
where  is the effective diffusion coefficient. The above equation implies that
 
Therefore, we can use s/L=0.001 to 0.01 for most problems. Though the exact derivation may require detailed analysis of the behaviour of Lévy flights.

Algorithm and convergence analysis will be fruitful, because there are many open problems related to metaheuristics

Theoretical analysis 
As significant efforts, theoretical analyses are required to improve performances of CS-base algorithms:
 Theoretical analysis on convergence of CS-based algorithms
 Providing the sufficient and necessary conditions for the control parameter settings
 Employing non-homogeneous search rules to enhance the classical CS algorithm

Improved Cuckoo Search Algorithms 

Convergence of Cuckoo Search algorithm can be substantially improved by genetically replacing abandoned nests (instead of using the random replacements from the original method). Modifications to the algorithm have also been made by additional interbreeding of best (high quality) nests  and this approach has been successfully applied to a range of industrial optimisation problems.

References 

Nature-inspired metaheuristics